"The Lazy Spinner" or "The Lazy Spinning Woman" is a German fairy tale collected by the Brothers Grimm, tale number 128.  It is Aarne-Thompson type 1405.

Synopsis

A lazy woman did not like to spin and when she did, did not wind onto a reel, but left it on the bobbin.  Her husband complained, and she said she needed a reel to do that, but when he went to cut one, she sneaked after and called out that whoever cut a reel would die. This put him off cutting it, but he still complained.  She then made some yarn and said it must be boiled. Then she put some tow in the pot instead and set her husband to watch.  After some time, he opened the pot, saw the tow, and thought he had ruined the yarn. From then on, the husband didn't dare complain.

External links

The Lazy Spinner
The Lazy Spinning Woman

Lazy Spinner
Textiles in folklore
ATU 1350-1439